Ade Airport is an airport serving Adé in Chad.

Airports in Chad
Ouaddaï Region